Mazhaiyur, also spelt Mazhaiyur, is a small town in Tiruvannamalai district of Tamil Nadu, India. Located on Chetpet-Vandavasi Road, the town is midway between Chetpet and Vandavasi.

References

Villages in Tiruvannamalai district